The Delphi Village School, also known as the Delphi Falls Schoolhouse, is a former one-room schoolhouse located at Delphi Falls, New York in Onondaga County, New York.  It was built between 1854 and 1860 and is a -story, frame, "T" plan, vernacular Greek Revival–style structure with a rear woodshed addition.  The entrance vestibule is topped by a distinctive Italianate-style belfry.  The school closed in 1960 and was subsequently converted to residential use.

It was listed on the National Register of Historic Places in 1986.

Gallery

References

One-room schoolhouses in New York (state)
Schoolhouses in the United States
School buildings on the National Register of Historic Places in New York (state)
School buildings completed in 1860
Buildings and structures in Onondaga County, New York
National Register of Historic Places in Onondaga County, New York